"Tornado of Souls" is a song by American thrash metal band Megadeth from their 1990 studio album Rust in Peace. Despite never being released as a single nor having a music video, the song remains of a staple of the band's catalog. The song is well-known for its guitar solo played by Marty Friedman, which is considered by many one of the greatest metal guitar solos of all time.

Music and lyrics 
"Tornado of Souls" is more melodic than many other songs on Rust in Peace. The solo is considered one of the best in heavy metal history, which frontman Dave Mustaine recognized from the first time he heard it. 

In a 2002 retrospective, lead guitarist Marty Friedman said that, quote:

"When I finished the solo to this one, Mustaine came into the studio, listened to it down once, turned around and without saying a word, shook my hand. It was at that moment that I felt like I was truly the guitarist for this band".

Bassist David Ellefson stated that, "because of the downpicking on 'Tornado', I would change it sometimes depending on who the drummer was". 

The lyrics of this song, like many of Megadeth's, are about frontman Dave Mustaine's ex-girlfriend, Diana.

Legacy 
"Tornado of Souls" has been played live nearly 1000 times by the band. Many consider the song's guitar solo played by Marty Friedman to be the best in the band's career, and in metal history. Friedman later re-recorded the song, along with other Megadeth songs Breadline and The Killing Road for his 7th studio album, Future Addict.

Accolades

Personnel

Appearances 
"Tornado of Souls" appeared in the 2009 video game Brütal Legend.
It, along with the rest of its parent album, was featured as DLC for the Rock Band video game series on February 9, 2010.

References 

Megadeth songs
1990 songs
Songs written by Dave Mustaine